Da Beatminerz are a hip-hop production crew from Bushwick, Brooklyn, and are known for their dark, gritty sound that is very popular with the underground hip-hop scene.

History
The crew, originally composed of brothers Mr. Walt (born June 2, 1968) and DJ Evil Dee (born May 24, 1971), formed in 1992, making their production debut with Evil Dee's group Black Moon, on its debut single, "Who Got Da Props?" The duo produced the entirety of Black Moon's acclaimed debut album, Enta Da Stage, in 1993, then continued production work with Black Moon's Buckshot and his crew Boot Camp Clik. In 1995, along with its third official member, Baby Paul, the group produced the entirety of Smif-N-Wessun's debut album, Dah Shinin'. It continued work with fellow Boot Camp members Heltah Skeltah and O.G.C. in 1996, contributing multiple beats for their respective debuts, Nocturnal and Da Storm. In the late 1990s, da Beatminerz expanded its client list, producing popular hip hop artists such as Afu-Ra, Black Star, Eminem, Flipmode Squad, M.O.P., De La Soul, Mic Geronimo, and O.C.

Also in 1996, they appeared on the Red Hot Organization's compilation CD, America is Dying Slowly, alongside Biz Markie, Wu-Tang Clan, and Fat Joe, among many other prominent hip hop artists. The CD, meant to raise awareness of the AIDS epidemic among African American men, was heralded as "a masterpiece" by The Source magazine. 
 
By 2001, the crew expanded to five members, with producers Rich Blak and Chocolate Ty joining Baby Paul, Evil Dee, and Mr. Walt. That year, the group released its debut album, Brace 4 Impak, on popular independent label Rawkus Records, featuring guest appearances from Royce Da 5'9", Black Moon, Ras Kass, Diamond D, Cocoa Brovaz, Pete Rock, Talib Kweli, Freddie Foxxx, Jean Grae, and Naughty by Nature. The album's lead single, "Take That," became a hip hop hit in 2001, hitting the Top 5 on the Hot Rap Singles chart. By 2004, the crew narrowed back to its original members, Evil Dee and Mr. Walt, and the duo released its second album, Fully Loaded w/ Statik, on Copter Records. In the new millennium, the group has crafted beats for artists such as Akrobatik, Big Daddy Kane, Black Moon, Boot Camp Clik, Craig G, Dilated Peoples, Jean Grae, KRS-One, Naughty By Nature, Smif-N-Wessun, and Wordsworth. Currently, Da Beatminerz are running their own internet radio station. They are currently set to produce the entirety of Black Moon's next LP, 'Dark Side Of The Moon'.

Discography

Albums
 Brace 4 Impak (2001, Rawkus Records)
 Fully Loaded w/ Statik (2004, Copter Records)
 Unmarked Music Vol. 1 (2007, Raw Deal Records) 

  ''Rah Deluxe   (2022, Supremacist ) Single

Production

References

External links 
 Bushwick’s Finest: Forgotten Heroes of the Brooklyn Hip Hop Red Bull Music Academy
 Mr. Walt on Andrew Meza's BTS Radio
 Dox: BEAT DIGGIN´

African-American musical groups
African-American record producers
American hip hop record producers
Boot Camp Clik
Five percenters
Hip hop groups from New York City
Musical groups established in 1992
Musical groups from Brooklyn
Record production duos
Record producers from New York (state)